Hans Nikolai Stavrand (4 January 1894 – 17 March 1980) was a Norwegian politician for the Liberal Party.

He was born in Trondenes.

He was elected to the Norwegian Parliament from Troms in 1950, and was re-elected on two occasions. He had previously served in the position of deputy representative during the terms 1934–1936 and 1937–1945.

Stavrand held various positions in Sandtorg municipality council between 1931 and 1956, serving as deputy mayor in 1937–1940.

References

1894 births
1980 deaths
Liberal Party (Norway) politicians
Members of the Storting
20th-century Norwegian politicians